Paul-René-Léon Ginain (5 October 1825, Paris - 7 March 1898, Paris) was a French architect.

Life and works 
He studied with Louis-Hippolyte Lebas at the École des Beaux-Arts. After having won the Prix de Rome in 1852, he stayed at the Villa Médicis in Rome from 1853 to 1857. 

As the official Architect of the City of Paris, he was in charge of the 6th Arrondissement. He was also a professor at the École. His notable students there include Emmanuel Masqueray and Ferdinand Dutert. In 1881, he was elected to the Académie des Beaux-Arts, where he took Seat #3 for architecture, succeeding Hector-Martin Lefuel (deceased).

Between 1867 and 1876, together with Gustave Eiffel and Eugène Bonté, he worked on rebuilding the church of Notre-Dame-des-Champs, which had been destroyed during the Revolution. Shortly after, she also commissioned him to design the Palais Galliera and supervise its construction, which would occupy him until 1894. 

He was initially interred at the Cimetière de Montmartre, but his remains were transferred to the Cimetière du Montparnasse in 1911.

References

Further reading 
 Dominique Leborgne, Saint-Germain des Prés et son faubourg : Évolution d'un paysage urbain, Éditions Parigramme 
 François Loyer, Histoire de l'architecture française : De la Révolution à nos jours, Éditions du patrimoine, 1999

External links

1825 births
1898 deaths
École des Beaux-Arts
Burials at Montparnasse Cemetery
Prix de Rome winners
Architects from Paris
Members of the Académie des beaux-arts